Erich Bernhard Theodor Schultz-Ewerth (8 March 1870 – 25 June 1935) was a German jurist, ethnologist and colonial administrator, who served as the last governor of German Samoa.

Life and work 
Erich Schultz-Ewerth entered the judicial service of the Kingdom of Prussia in 1892 and passed the major state examination in 1897. After joining the Colonial Department of the Foreign Office in 1898, he traveled to German East Africa at the end of the year, where he served as a district judge. In 1899 he had to travel back to Germany due to illness. After a brief return to the judiciary, he was transferred at his own request back to the Colonial Department on 22 December 1899, and was appointed as a district judge to German Samoa in 1901, and eventually appointed the Imperial Chief Judge in 1910. He received the title of Geheimrat in 1911. He became the acting Governor of German Samoa on 19 December 1911, succeeding Wilhelm Solf, the first Governor of the colony. He was appointed as Solf's permanent successor on 19 June 1912, and continued to hold the position of Imperial Chief Judge as well. During the German interracial marriage debate (1912), he issued a controversial ban on interracial marriages. In 1914, after the outbreak of World War I and the occupation of German Samoa by the New Zealand Army troops, he was taken prisoner of war and held in captivity until 1919. For a short time after the war he defended Germans before foreign courts. He then worked as an author of books on colonial issues.

In his Memories of Samoa, he described the economic and political importance of Samoa, colonization, the South Seas as a colonial area, as well as superstition, polygamy, cannibalism and funeral ceremonies.

During his studies in 1888 he became a member of the Burschenschaft Thuringia Charlottenburg / Berlin, which still exists today under the name Vereinigte Berliner Burschenschaft Thuringia.

Marriage and family 
Schultz-Ewerth was married to the writer Charlott Schultz-Ewerth (pseudonym Christa Maria Parcham) (born on 11 June 1898). The marriage ended in divorce. Her works include The New Church Book. A book by Mut and German Art, Kribe-Verlag, Berlin 1929, Allerleirauh, Bioletta and A Girl Experiences the Revolution.

His son was the singer and actor Mario Tuala (1924–1961).

References

Bibliography

External links
 

1870 births
1935 deaths
German jurists
German ethnologists
People of former German colonies
Colonial people of German East Africa
German Samoa
History of Samoa
German people of World War I
German prisoners of war in World War I
Multiracial affairs